Pierre-Ulric Dubuisson (23 January 1746 in Laval, Mayenne – 24 March 1794) was an 18th-century French actor, playwright and theatre director.
 
Sympathetic to the Hébertists he was denounced by Robespierre as having intended to sow discord among the Jacobins and was tried by the Revolutionary Court. He was sentenced to death and guillotined with other Hébertists on 24 March 1794 at the age of 48 years.

Works 
Theatre
1778: L'École des pères, ou les Effets de la prévention, Cap-Français, 21 March
1780: Nadir, ou Thamas-Kouli-Kan, tragedy in 5 acts and in verse, Paris, Théâtre de la Nation (Salle des Machines), 31 August
1782: Le Vieux Garçon, comedy in 5 acts, in verse, Théâtre de l'Odéon, 16 December.
1783: Trasime et Timagène, tragedy in 5 acts and in verse, Rouen, Grand Théâtre.
1785: Le Nouveau Sorcier, comedy en trois acts, Théâtre de Gand, 29 January
1785: Albert et Émilie, tragedy, Paris, Théâtre de l'Odéon, 30 April
1786: Scanderberg, tragedy in 5 acts and in verse, Théâtre de l'Odéon, 9 May
1786: Le Roi Théodore à Venise, opera héroï-comique in 4 acts, music by Giovanni Paisiello, Vienna.
1786: Hélène et Francisque, opéra-comique en 4 actes, Château de Versailles, August
1789: L'Impresario in angustie, ou le Directeur dans l'embarras, opera bouffe in 2 acts, music by Domenico Cimarosa, Théâtre de Monsieur, 6 May Text online
1789: L'Arbre de Diane, comédie en vaudeville in 3 acts, Brussels, Théâtre de la Monnaie, 12 September.
1790: Les Époux mécontents, opéra-comique en 3 actes, music by Stephen Storace, Théâtre Montansier, 12 April.
1790: La Villageoise enlevée, comédie en vaudeville in 3 acts, Théâtre-Français, 5 July.
1790: Le Curieux indiscret, opera bouffe in 3 acts, Théâtre Montansier, 23 September
1791: Les Époux mécontents, ou le Divorce, Brussels, Théâtre de la Monnaie, 4 March
1792: La Revanche, ou les Deux Frères, opera in 3 acts, Théâtre des Amis de la Patrie, 11 January
1792: Les Talismans, opera in 3 acts, Théâtre des Amis de la Patrie, 12 January
1792: Flora, opera in 3 acts, Théâtre des Amis de la Patrie, 4 February
1794: Zélia, ou le Mari à deux femmes, drama in three acts mingled with music, after Goethe, music by Prosper-Didier Deshayes, Théâtre des Amis de la Patrie, 3 June Text online
1796: Zelia, ou la Grille enchantée, Comédie Italienne, 26 November
undated: Stella, drama in 3 acts, mingled with music, after Goethe, Text online
Varia
1771: Le Tableau de la volupté, ou les Quatre parties du jour, poem in free verse. 
1778: Abregé de la Révolution de l'Amérique anglaise, depuis le commencement de l'année 1774 jusqu'au premier janvier 1778, Text online
1785: Nouvelles considérations sur St-Domingue, en réponse à celles de M. H. D..
1785: Lettres critiques et politiques sur les colonies et le commerce des villes maritimes de France, adressées à G.-T. Raynal, with Dubucq, Text online

References

Bibliography 
Auguste-Philippe Herlaut, Autour d'Hébert. I. Deux témoins de la Terreur : le citoyen Dubuisson, le cidevant baron de Haindel, Paris, Clavreuil, 1958
 Louis-Gabriel Michaud, Biographie universelle ancienne et moderne, Paris, 1855, t. XL ;
 Jean-Barthélemy Hauréau, Histoire littéraire du Maine. Paris, 1872, t. IV. ;
 Archives nationales, W lA 76 et W 339. T 1683. #°406 and T 1685, #230. ;

External links 
 His page on CÉSAR. Archived copy.

1746 births
1794 deaths
People from Laval, Mayenne
18th-century French dramatists and playwrights
French theatre managers and producers
French people executed by guillotine during the French Revolution
18th-century French male actors
French male stage actors
18th-century French historians